Cory Paix (born 27 January 2000) is a professional rugby league footballer who plays as a  for the Brisbane Broncos in the NRL.

Playing career

2018
In 2018 Paix played for the Norths Devils U20s Colts team which won the premiership at Suncorp Stadium against the Blackhawks. The team also featured young Broncos Ethan Bullemor, Jordan Riki, and Kobe Hetherington. The four of them also featured for West Brisbane Panthers in the Brisbane Rugby League A Grade competition throughout times in 2018 as well.

2020
Paix made his debut in round 4 of the 2020 NRL season for Brisbane against the Sydney Roosters.
Paix in Round 9 won his first NRL game against the Canterbury-Bankstown Bulldogs in a 22-8 victory. Paix in Round 15 scored his first NRL try against the St. George Illawarra Dragons, in a 28-24 loss. Paix made 13 appearances in his debut season which saw Brisbane finish last on the table for the first time in their history.

2021 & 2022
Paix was limited to only four matches in the 2021 NRL season which saw Brisbane miss the finals. Paix played 12 games for Brisbane in the 2022 NRL season as the club finished 9th on the table and missed the finals.

References

External links
Brisbane Broncos profile

2000 births
Australian rugby league players
Rugby league hookers
Brisbane Broncos players
Rugby league halfbacks
Living people